Joaquin Independent School District is a public school district based in Joaquin, Texas (USA).  Located in northeastern Shelby County, the district extends into a small portion of Panola County. A portion of the district (connected to the other by a portion of Toledo Bend Reservoir) is located in southeastern Shelby County and includes parts of Huxley.  In 2009, the school district was rated "recognized" by the Texas Education Agency.

Schools
Joaquin High School (Grades 9-12)
Joaquin Junior High School (Gades 6-8)
Joaquin Elementary School (Grades PK-5)

References

External links
Joaquin ISD

School districts in Shelby County, Texas
School districts in Panola County, Texas